The Elias Meyers House is a private house located at 912 Baxter Street in Petoskey, Michigan. It was placed on the National Register of Historic Places in 1986.

The Elias Meyers House is a two-story front gable Queen Anne structure. A single story, hip roof entrance porch is attached to one side of the building, and a single story wing extends from the porch to the rear of the house. Decorative turned elements on the porch and on the front gable are inspired by Eastlake designs. The gable also has diagonal sheathing boards. Windows in the house are one-over-one double-hung units with decorative cornices.

The Elias Meyers House was constructed some time before 1899. It was associated with Elias Meyers, an employee and eventual foreman at the Forman & Curtis Flooring factory.

References

Houses on the National Register of Historic Places in Michigan
Queen Anne architecture in Michigan
Emmet County, Michigan